Last of the Long-haired Boys is a 1968 British drama film starring Richard Todd, Gillian Raine and Patrick Barr.

Plot summary
After the end of the Second World War an RAF pilot struggles to adjust to civilian life.

Cast
 Richard Todd - Trigg
 Gillian Raine - Mara Trigg
 Patrick Barr - Conyers
 Malcolm Tierney - Jason Trigg
 Sonia Dresdel - Mrs. Dearborn
 Susan Jameson - Bimba
 David Markham - Brindle
 Peter Marinker - Jamie Dearborn
 Michael Bishop - Wounded pilot

References

External links

1968 films
British drama films
1960s English-language films
1960s British films